Modern Physics Letters A (MPLA) is the first in a series of journals published by World Scientific under the title Modern Physics Letters. It covers specifically papers and research on gravitation, cosmology, nuclear physics, and particles and fields.

Related journals 
 Modern Physics Letters B
 International Journal of Modern Physics A
 International Journal of Modern Physics D
 International Journal of Modern Physics E

Abstracting and indexing 
According to the Journal Citation Reports, the journal had an impact factor of 1.594 for 2021. The journal is abstracted and indexed in:

 Science Citation Index
 SciSearch
 ISI Alerting Services
 Current Contents/Physical, Chemical & Earth Sciences
 Astrophysics Data System (ADS) Abstract Service
 Mathematical Reviews
 Inspec
 Zentralblatt MATH

External links

References 

World Scientific academic journals
Publications established in 1986
Physics journals